Shania Collins (born November 14, 1996) is an American athlete. In February 2019, she won the gold medal in the 60 meters event at the 2019 USA Indoor Track and Field Championships.

Professional
Collins runs professionally for Adidas since 2018.

NCAA Track Major meet results
Collins graduated from University of Tennessee and signed with Adidas in 2018.

Prep
Collins graduated from Huntingtown High School as a 8-time Maryland Public Secondary Schools Athletic Association state champion.

References

External links
 

1996 births
Living people
American female sprinters
African-American female track and field athletes
People from Calvert County, Maryland
Track and field athletes from Maryland
Texas Longhorns women's track and field athletes
Tennessee Volunteers women's track and field athletes
Sportspeople from the Washington metropolitan area
Athletes (track and field) at the 2019 Pan American Games
Pan American Games bronze medalists for the United States
Pan American Games medalists in athletics (track and field)
Pan American Games track and field athletes for the United States
USA Indoor Track and Field Championships winners
Medalists at the 2019 Pan American Games
21st-century African-American women
21st-century African-American sportspeople